The William Jennings Bryan House is a historic home located at 107 Evelyn Pl. in Asheville, Buncombe County, North Carolina.  It was designed by architects Smith & Carrier and built in 1917. It is a two-story, five bay, side-gable roofed dwelling in the Colonial Revival style. This was the home of William Jennings Bryan from 1917 until he sold the house in 1920.

It was listed on the National Register of Historic Places in 1983.

References

External links

Houses on the National Register of Historic Places in North Carolina
Colonial Revival architecture in North Carolina
Houses completed in 1917
Houses in Asheville, North Carolina
William Jennings Bryan
National Register of Historic Places in Buncombe County, North Carolina
1917 establishments in North Carolina